Chenar Shahijan or Chenar-e Shahi Jan may refer to:
 Chenar Shahijan, Marvdasht
 Chenar Shahijan District, in Kazerun County